Costa Azul is a village and resort of the Costa de Oro in the Canelones Department of southern Uruguay.

Population
In 2011 Costa Azul had a population of 965.
 
Source: Instituto Nacional de Estadística de Uruguay

References

External links
INE map of Parque del Plata, La Floresta, Estación La Floresta, Costa Azul and Bello Horizonte

Populated places in the Canelones Department
Seaside resorts in Uruguay